Tony Packo's Cafe is a restaurant that started in the Hungarian neighborhood of Birmingham, on the east side of Toledo, Ohio, at 1902 Front Street. Starting in 1932, the restaurant became famous when it was mentioned in several M*A*S*H episodes and is noted for its signature sandwich and large collection of hot dog buns signed by celebrities.

History
 
During the Great Depression in 1932, Tony Packo used a $100 loan to open his shop, which originally sold only sandwiches and ice cream. In 1935, the Packo family purchased the current wedge-shaped (flat iron-shaped) building on the corner of Front and Consaul streets next to the Maumee River, which includes the former Consaul Tavern.

Tony's signature "sausage-and-sauce sandwich" on rye was first made when he decided to add a spicy chili sauce to his sandwiches for more flavor. Eventually, his creation became known as the "Hungarian hot dog", even though no such thing had come from the Old Country.  The dish quickly became popular and the cafe is now billed as "the place where man bites dog". The "hot dog" is really a Hungarian sausage called kolbász, not unlike the Polish kielbasa, about twice the diameter of a conventional hot dog, and slicing the sausage in half yields about the same amount of meat.

When Tony became seriously ill in 1962, his daughter Nancy Packo Horvath took control of the business. Tony died in 1963 at the age of 55; his son Tony Jr. (Horvath's brother) joined the company in 1968 at the age of 20. The company had a long period of growth in the late 1960s under the leadership of the siblings. The Packos started in the packaged food business in 1980 after Merco Foods agreed to carry a line of pickles under the family brand.

In July 2002, Horvath and her son Robin (himself a Packo's vice president) sued Tony Jr. and his son Tony Packo III for libel, breach of duty, and trying to force her out of the business. A week later, Tony Jr. and Tony III counter-sued to dissolve the business, claiming that as each family owned 50 percent of the company they were at an impasse. The families settled their dispute in October 2002 by adding an impartial third person to the company's board of directors. Tony Jr. said that the problem occurred due to having no formalized succession plan in place. Soon after the dispute was settled, Horvath was diagnosed with cancer and died on April 23, 2003.

Robert G. Bennett bought Tony Packo's, Inc., in October 2011 for $5.5 million in a court-ordered sale. Bennett died in May 2013.

In October 2019, Packo's opened up two concept stores in Perrysburg, Ohio, and Holland, Ohio area Kroger grocery stores.

Packos's has long been "Toledo’s most famous eatery."  It is “a Toledo institution.”

Bun signing

When actor Burt Reynolds visited Toledo in 1972, he made a stop at the restaurant on the suggestion of Tony's daughter, Nancy. Reynolds was the first big name to eat at Packo's, and he also began the tradition of "bun signing" when he inscribed his signature on a Packo hot dog bun. Ever since then, celebrities who visit the restaurant sign a "bun"—now a foam, air-brushed look-alike—and have it placed on the walls of Packo's.

M*A*S*H
Tony Packo's Cafe gained world-wide fame when M*A*S*H character Maxwell Klinger, who was played by Toledo native Jamie Farr, made mention of the restaurant as his favorite eatery. Tony Packo's was mentioned in six episodes of the series.

In the season 4 (1976) episode "The Interview", Klinger says to interviewer Clete Roberts, "Incidentally, if you're ever in Toledo, Ohio, on the Hungarian side of town, Tony Packo's, greatest Hungarian hot dogs, with chili peppers, 35 cents, and a cold beer!" 

In the Season 6 (1977) "The Grim Reaper", Klinger and a wounded soldier, Private Danker, exchange nostalgic memories of Toledo. Danker says he had his last Hungarian hot dog just three days before he shipped out for Korea. After Danker has been sent home, he sends Klinger some Packo's Hungarian hot dogs and chili peppers, which Klinger shares with Hawkeye Pierce, B.J. Hunnicutt, and Charles Winchester.

In the Season 7 (1978) episode "Dear Sis", Klinger relays to Father Mulcahy about his dream of "Christmas tree, 10 feet high. Strung with an endless chain of Packo's Hungarian hot dogs. And up on top, dressed like an angel, is my ex-wife, Laverne."

The season 8 (1980) episode "Dreams" features the visual of Tony Packo's in the M*A*S*H series. Here, Klinger falls asleep out of exhaustion and dreams he is walking through the windswept deserted streets of Toledo. He looks through the shop window of Tony Packo's, but he only sees the 4077th Operating Room with Colonel Potter gesturing to him. The patient turns to look at him and Klinger finds that the patient is himself. (The address as seen on the restaurant store front, 1902 Front Street, is accurate, but the scene was filmed on a set and not on location.)

In the Season 9 (1980) episode "A War for All Seasons", the hospital unit orders a batch of sausage casings from Tony Packo's to use in a blood-filtering machine (a crude artificial kidney).

In the season 11 (1983) finale "Goodbye, Farewell and Amen" (the series' two-and-a-half hour final episode), when Klinger finds out that B.J. has received his orders to return home, he says, "Boy, what a lucky guy. I'd give anything to be back in Toledo. Sitting in Packo's with the guys, having a beer and eating a dog while the chili sauce drips down your arm..."

The actual Tony Packo's restaurant exhibits memorabilia from M*A*S*H on the premises, including the prop box used for the sausage casings in "A War for All Seasons".

See also
 Coney Island hot dog

References

Notes

Bibliography

Further reading
 
 Christoff, Chris (April 1, 2014). "Detroit’s Coney Island Hot Dogs Are Edible Solace for City". Bloomberg.

 .
 .
 
 
 Yung, Katherine and Joe Grimm (2012). Coney Detroit. Detroit, Michigan: Wayne State University Press. .

External links 
 Tony Packo's Cafe website

Companies based in Toledo, Ohio
Culture of Toledo, Ohio
Hot dog restaurants in the United States
Restaurants in Ohio
Hungarian-American cuisine
Hungarian restaurants
Hungarian-American culture in Ohio
Tourist attractions in Toledo, Ohio
Restaurants established in 1932
1932 establishments in Ohio